Oliver Twist is a 2005 drama film directed by Roman Polanski. The screenplay by Ronald Harwood adapts Charles Dickens's 1838 novel of the same name. It is an international co-production of the United Kingdom, the Czech Republic, France and the United States.

The film premiered at the 2005 Toronto International Film Festival on 11 September 2005 before going into limited release in the United States on 23 September. It received mixed to positive reviews from critics, but was a commercial failure.

Plot
Nine-year-old orphaned Oliver Twist is taken to the workhouse by the beadle Mr. Bumble. After daring to ask for more food, Oliver is sold as an apprentice to Mr. Sowerberry, a local undertaker, but runs away following harsh treatment.

Oliver travels a seven-day journey to London where he befriends a young boy named Jack Dawkins, better known as the Artful Dodger, who takes him to join a gang of pickpockets led by the villainous Fagin. He also becomes acquainted with Nancy, a former pupil of Fagin's who is in love with Fagin's associate, Bill Sikes. Dodger and his friend Charley Bates take Oliver out to teach him to pick pockets - it ends in disaster when Oliver is falsely arrested for stealing from Mr. Brownlow. However, Mr. Brownlow decides to take Oliver in and care for him when he learns of the boy's innocence.

Fagin and Sikes become worried that Oliver will bring down the authorities onto them, so force Nancy to help bring Oliver back. Sikes forces Oliver to help him rob Mr. Brownlow's house at gunpoint - Oliver is wounded in a shootout between Sikes and Mr. Brownlow. Sikes and Fagin later decided that Oliver knows too much and will likely 'peach' on them. Sikes suggests that they kill the boy, to which Fagin agrees, despite caring for the boy. Nancy overhears this and manages to inform Mr. Brownlow of Fagin's plan, managing to keep Sikes out of it. However, unbeknownst to her, Dodger has been sent by Fagin to spy on her and tells Fagin and Sikes, the latter of whom murders her.

Nancy's murder becomes public and the police across the city intend to arrest both Sikes and Fagin, for murder and abduction, respectively. Sikes' dog, Bullseye, leads the authorities to the gang's hideout. Sikes uses Oliver as a hostage whilst attempting to escape, but accidentally hangs himself. Oliver is brought back to live with Mr. Brownlow and goes to visit Fagin in jail. He is sad to see Fagin, who was kind to him, hallucinating and even more devastated to hear that Fagin will be executed for his crimes. The film ends with Oliver and Mr. Brownlow returning home to continue their lives, whilst a crowd gather to witness preparations of Fagin's hanging.

Cast

 Ben Kingsley as Fagin
 Jamie Foreman as William "Bill" Sikes
 Barney Clark as Oliver Twist
 Leanne Rowe as Nancy
 Edward Hardwicke as Mr. Brownlow
 Harry Eden as The Artful Dodger (Jack Dawkins)
 Mark Strong as Toby Crackit
 Frances Cuka as Mrs. Bedwin
 Lewis Chase as Charley Bates
 Michael Heath as Mr. Sowerberry
 Gillian Hanna as Mrs. Sowerberry
 Chris Overton as Noah Claypole
 Jeremy Swift as Mr. Bumble
 Paul Brooke as Mr. Grimwig
 Ian McNeice as Mr. Limbkins
 Alun Armstrong as Magistrate Fang
 Liz Smith as Old Woman
 Patrick Godfrey as Bookseller

Production

In Twist by Polanski, a bonus feature on the DVD release of the film, Roman Polanski discusses his decision to make yet another screen adaptation of the Dickens novel. He realized nearly forty years had passed since Oliver Twist had been adapted for a feature film, and felt it was time for a new version. Screenwriter Ronald Harwood, with whom he had collaborated on The Pianist, welcomed the opportunity to work on the first Dickens project in his career.

For authenticity, all scenes featuring pickpocket skills were choreographed by stage pickpocket James Freedman and magician Martyn Rowland.

The film was shot in Prague, Beroun, and Žatec in the Czech Republic.

Differences from the Novel
Due to the complex plot, several characters and events were omitted or changed.

The film does not explain where Oliver was raised prior to arriving at the workhouse. Mr. Bumble's role is reduced - there is no mention of him losing his job at the workhouse. Additionally, the characters of Monks (Oliver's half brother) and the Widow Corney are absent, therefore omitting any plot to destroy the locket proving Oliver's identity as well as Fagin and Monks' plan to prevent Oliver from inheriting his father's fortune by having him commit a crime. To make up for the absence of Monks, there is a plot in which Fagin and Sikes conspire to murder Oliver - an event which does not occur in the novel.

In the novel, it is left ambiguous as to how Oliver and Mr. Brownlow are related. As in many versions (such as the 1997 Disney version and the 1948 adaptation by David Lean), Brownlow is made Oliver's grandfather, however, unlike in previous versions, this relationship is more implied than explicitly stated.

Due to the absence of the Maylie family, Oliver is not left by Sikes to die during the burglary, rather he is taken back to Fagin's. The Artful Dodger is not deported to Australia and, therefore, plays a larger role in some of the later events in the story. Firstly, like in David Lean's 1948 film and the 1974 animated version produced by Filmation, he is sent by Fagin (instead of Noah Claypole who appears only in the earlier scenes) to spy on Nancy, indirectly causing her death by informing Fagin and Sikes that she has informed on them. Secondly, it is Dodger (instead of Charley Bates, whose role is also smaller in the film than the novel) who turns against Fagin and attempts to give up Sikes to the police for murdering Nancy. However, his ultimate fate is left unknown after Sikes' death.

Reception
The film received mixed to positive reviews, holding a 61% score on Rotten Tomatoes based on 143 reviews, averaging 6.3/10. The consensus reads, "Polanski's version of Dickens' classic won't have audiences asking for more because while polished and directed with skill, the movie's a very impersonal experience." Metacritic assigned a score of 65, indicating 'generally favorable reviews.'

A. O. Scott of The New York Times called it a "bracingly old-fashioned" film that "does not embalm its source with fussy reverence" but "rediscovers its true and enduring vitality." He added, "the look of the movie... is consistent with its interpretation of Dickens's worldview, which could be plenty grim but which never succumbed to despair. There is just enough light, enough grace, enough beauty, to penetrate the gloom and suggest the possibility of redemption. The script... is at once efficient and ornate, capturing Dickens's narrative dexterity and his ear for the idioms of English speech."

Roger Ebert of the Chicago Sun-Times was similarly positive; he lauded the film as "visually exact and detailed without being too picturesque." Mick LaSalle of the San Francisco Chronicle praised it as a "grounded and unusually matter-of-fact adaptation," continuing, "Polanski does justice to Dickens' moral universe, in which the motives and worldview of even the worst people are made comprehensible."

Lisa Schwarzbaum of Entertainment Weekly graded the film B+ and commented, "On the face of it, Roman Polanski's Oliver Twist is in the tradition of every faithful Oliver Twist ever filmed – a photogenic, straightforward, CliffsNotes staging of Charles Dickens' harrowing story... Yet precisely because this is by Roman Polanski, it's irresistible to read his sorrowful and seemingly classical take, from a filmmaker known as much for the schisms in his personal history as for the lurches in his work, as something much more personal and poignant."

However, Peter Travers of Rolling Stone rated two out of four stars, calling it "drab and unfeeling" while "lacking the Polanski stamp." He further felt Barney Clark's performance as Oliver was "bereft of personality." Todd McCarthy of Variety echoed Travers' sentiments about Clark, labelling him "disappointingly wan and unengaging," while writing that the film was "conventional, straightforward" and "a respectable literary adaptation, but [lacking] dramatic urgency and intriguing undercurrents."

In the UK press, Peter Bradshaw of The Guardian opined that while "[Polanski's] Oliver Twist does not flag or lose its way and is always watchable, the book's original power and force have not been rediscovered." Philip French of The Observer wrote that the film was "generally disappointing, though by no means badly acted," and alleged that it lacked "any serious point of view about individuality, society, community."

Home media
Sony Pictures released the film on DVD on 24 January 2006. It is in anamorphic widescreen format, with audio tracks and subtitles in English and French. Bonus features include Twist by Polanski, in which the director reflects on the making of the film; The Best of Twist, which includes interviews with production designer Allan Starski, costume designer Anna B. Sheppard, cinematographer Paweł Edelman, editor Hervé de Luze, and composer Rachel Portman; and Kidding with Oliver Twist, which focuses on the young actors in the cast.

References

External links
 
 
 
 
 

2005 films
2005 drama films
British drama films
American drama films
Films about homelessness
Films based on Oliver Twist
Films set in the 1830s
Films set in London
Films directed by Roman Polanski
Films produced by Roman Polanski
Films about orphans
Films shot in the Czech Republic
Films produced by Alain Sarde
Films scored by Rachel Portman
English-language Czech films
English-language French films
TriStar Pictures films
Summit Entertainment films
Films with screenplays by Ronald Harwood
2000s English-language films
2000s British films
2000s French films
2000s American films